Namacurra is a small town in um dos distrito da provincia da zambezia central Mozambique.

Transport 

It lies on the former railway between Quelimane and Vila de Mocuba.

See also 
 Railway stations in Mozambique

References 

Populated places in Zambezia Province